Timothy George Maloney (9 December 1908 – 1966) was a footballer who played in the Football League for Darlington and Stoke City.

Career
Maloney played non-league football for Grangetown and South Bank before joining his local league club Middlesbrough in 1926. He failed to make an appearance for Boro and joined Hull City a year later however again failed to make his mark and so joined Darlington. He showed his abilities for "Darlo" scoring four goals in thirteen matches from the wing position which prompted Stoke City to sign him in 1931. However he never impressed and after eight appearances and one goal in 1931–32, Maloney was released and he re-joined South Bank.

Career statistics
Source:

References

1908 births
1966 deaths
Footballers from Middlesbrough
English footballers
Association football outside forwards
South Bank F.C. players
Middlesbrough F.C. players
Hull City A.F.C. players
Darlington F.C. players
Stoke City F.C. players
English Football League players